Lewis Strang (7 August 1884 – 20 July 1911) was an American racecar driver.

Biography
He was born on August 7, 1884 in Amsterdam, New York. As the first entrant for the race, which predated modern on-track qualifications, Strang was pole sitter for the 1911 Indianapolis 500.

He was killed in a testing accident in Wisconsin  July 20, 1911 while driving 5 miles an hour and trying to avoid an approaching farmer.

Legacy
In 1951, historian Russ Catlin selected Strang as the 1908 National Champion.

Indianapolis 500 results

References

External links

Lewis Strang statistics at ChampCarStats.com

1884 births
1911 deaths
Grand Prix drivers
Indianapolis 500 drivers
Indianapolis 500 polesitters
People from Amsterdam, New York
Racing drivers from New York (state)
Racing drivers who died while racing
Sports deaths in Wisconsin